Ranks and insignia of the Reichsarbeitsdienst were paramilitary ranks used by the Reich Labour Service.

Rank structure

Rank insignia 1943-1945

Chevrons
Used in 1940

Pay of the Stammpersonal

Mean annual pay for an industrial worker was 1,459 Reichsmark 1939, and for a privately employed  white-collar worker 2,772 Reichsmark.

References

Notes

Cited literature
 Deutsches Reichsgesetzblatt Teil I, 1867-1945. [Cited as RGBl I]
 

Nazi paramilitary ranks

External links
 The German Reichsarbeitsdienst (Reich Labor Service)